Pittsburg is a ghost town in Colfax County, New Mexico, United States. In 1922, Ray Pittman and his brother Russell Pittman constructed and became proprietors of a grocery store located six miles northwest of Gladstone. During 1924, a post office was established in the community and was located in Ray Pittman's store, thus becoming known as Pittsburg, New Mexico. The postmistress was Bernice Martin Pittman, wife of Ray Pittman. The post office remained in the building until 1932, at which time it was closed. Pittsburg is no longer in existence; only a small pile of rubble remains where the store once stood.

History of Colfax County, New Mexico
Ghost towns in New Mexico
Geography of Colfax County, New Mexico